Borova is a small village in the municipality of Pljevlja, Montenegro. It is located close to the Serbian border.

Demographics
According to the 2003 census, the village had a population of  79 people.

According to the 2011 census, its population was 69.

References

Populated places in Pljevlja Municipality